WLFS (91.9 FM) is a Christian radio station broadcasting a Contemporary Christian music format. Licensed to Port Wentworth, Georgia, United States, it serves the Savannah and Hilton Head areas.  The station is currently owned by Radio Training Network.

The station broadcasts the following HD Radio subchannels:

External links
WLFS official site

LFS